The Governor of Khyber Pakhtunkhwa is the appointed head of state of the provincial government in Khyber Pakhtunkhwa (formerly North-West Frontier Province), Pakistan. Although the governor is the head of the province on paper, it is largely a ceremonial position; and the main powers lie with the chief minister of Khyber Pakhtunkhwa and chief secretary Khyber Pakhtunkhwa.

However, throughout the history of Pakistan, the powers of the provincial governors were vastly increased, when the provincial assemblies were dissolved and the administrative role came under direct control of the governors, as in the cases of martial laws of 1958–1972 and 1977–1985, and governor rules of 1999–2002. In the case of Khyber Pakhtunkhwa, there were two direct governor rules, in 1975 and 1994, when the provincial chief ministers of those times were removed and assemblies dissolved.

List of Governors

See also 
 Chief Minister of Khyber Pakhtunkhwa
 Government of Khyber Pakhtunkhwa
 Provincial Assembly of Khyber Pakhtunkhwa
 List of Governors of Pakistan
 List of Chief Ministers in Pakistan

References

Official website of Government of the Khyber Pakhtunkhwa

Governors of Pakistani provinces